Ad nauseam is a Latin term for argument or other discussion that has continued 'to [the point of] nausea'.

Ad Nauseam may also refer to:

 Ad Nauseam (Dog Fashion Disco album), 2015
 Ad Nauseam (The Rotted album), 2011
 Ad Nauseam, a 1995 album by The Tiger Lillies
 AdNauseam, a browser extension that works together with AdBlock; see Helen Nissenbaum
 "Ad Nauseam", a song by Fad Gadget from the 1984 album Gag
 Derek and Clive Ad Nauseam, an album by Peter Cook and Dudley Moore
 A 1980s band with Jon Poole